Alfred Salmon (20 July 1868 – 11 October 1928), was the chairman of J. Lyons and Co. from 1923 to 1928.

Early life
He was the eldest son of Barnett Salmon and Helena Gluckstein, the daughter of Samuel Gluckstein.

Career
Salmon was the chairman of J. Lyons and Co. from 1923 to 1928.

Personal life
Salmon married Frances Abrahams in 1894, and they had three children:

Barnett Alfred Salmon (1895–1965), grandfather of Fiona Shackleton (née Charkham) 
Felix Addison Salmon (1908–1969), grandfather of Nigella Lawson and Dominic Lawson
Ivor Francis Salmon (1911–2004)

References

1868 births
1928 deaths
British Jews
Gluckstein family
Alfred
British businesspeople